IIT Krishnamurthy is a 2020 Indian Telugu-language mystery film, written & Directed by Sree Vardhan and produced by Nekuri Prasad, Akki. Dandamudi Pruthvi, Maira Doshi, Vinay Varma plays lead roles in the film. The film premiered on 10 December 2020 on Amazon Prime Video. The film was dubbed in Tamil, Kannada and Malayalam with the same name.

Plot 
Krishnamurthy, an IIT Bombay student, comes to Hyderabad and gets to know that his uncle is missing. Krishnamurthy then finds his missing uncle which is a mystery.

Cast 

 Dandamudi Pruthvi as Krishnamurthy
 Maira Doshi as Jahnavi
 Vinay Varma as ACP Vinay Varma
 Anand as Srinivas Rao
 Satya as Mahesh Babu
 Alok Jain as Swaminathan 
 Banerjee as Auditor Narayana Rao
 Swarnakanth as PA Kiran
 Vinodh Nuvvula as Siddharth
 Chitti Babu as CBI Officer
 Bala as Mrs. Srinivasa Rao
 Pravalika Reddy as Vidha, Jahnavi's friend
 Sahithi Dasari as News Anchor

Music

Reception 
Thadhagath Pathi of The Times of India wrote that "IIT Krishnamurthy is a film that will not put you to sleep and qualifies as an attempt that is appreciable. To know if an IITian is truly brainier than the most experienced cop is something you need to watch."

Cinema Express wrote that "With patchy narration, which lacks fluidity, and no impacting emotional anchors either, the film reaches a crucial moment when the knots are untied. The reveal is one that entirely depends on chance rather than on acumen of the supposed mastermind — it is also full of flaws. Why was it important to overemphasise that the talented, brilliant Krishnamurthy is from IIT? Couldn’t someone from another institution be just as crafty and clever? Considering the emotional anchor that the film poses to have, wouldn’t something on the lines of ‘Deepam Krishnamurthy’ work better as the title and the story’s emblem, without undermining said emotional connect? The only ray of light is Satya Akkala’s comedy. It's a pity that his excellent one-liners are almost overshadowed by the cloud of dismay that the rest of the film evokes."

Vishal Menon of Film Companion wrote that "What doesn’t help either is the film’s over-reliance on the big ending. It’s like the makers decided to explain everything with one long stretch of dialogue. So if something hadn’t made sense until then, they’re just going to attribute even that to the hero’s genius. There’s no room for errors in Krishnamurthy’s plans and the sequence of things that has to fall right in place for his desired result seems annoyingly implausible. In other places, details about financial fraud and the whole police operation are too simplistic to be taken seriously. "

References

External links 

 

2020 films
2020s mystery films
2020s Telugu-language films
Films not released in theaters due to the COVID-19 pandemic
Films set in Hyderabad, India
Films shot in Hyderabad, India
Indian mystery films
Amazon Prime Video original films